Kirsten Dufour (born 1943) is a Danish visual artist. She works with performance as well as other mediums to bring attention to social injustices. Dufour was co-curator of the 2004 interdisciplinary exhibition Minority Report: Challenging Intolerance in Contemporary Denmark. She currently lives and works in Copenhagen, Denmark.

References

1943 births
Living people
20th-century Danish women artists
20th-century Danish artists
21st-century Danish women artists
Danish women curators